The 2019 Virginia Tech Hokies men's soccer team represented Virginia Tech during the 2019 NCAA Division I men's soccer season. It was the 48th season of the University fielding a program.  The Hokies played their home games at Sandra D. Thompson Field in Blacksburg, Virginia.  The Hokies were led by eleventh year head coach Mike Brizendine.

Background

The 2018 Virginia Tech men's soccer team finished the season with a 11–7–3 overall record and a 3–4–1 ACC record.  The Hokies were seeded seventh–overall in the 2018 ACC Men's Soccer Tournament.  The Hokies won their first round match up against Syracuse, but fell to North Caorlina in the second round.  The Hokies earned an at-large bid into the 2018 NCAA Division I Men's Soccer Tournament.  As the twelfth overall seed Virginia Tech defeated Charlotte in the second round, before losing to James Madison in the third round.

Player movement

Players leaving

Players arriving

Virginia Tech announced its 2019 signing class of six players on November 28, 2018.

Squad

Roster

Updated: December 2, 2019

Team management

Source:

Schedule 

Source:

|-
!colspan=7 style=""| Exhibition

|-
!colspan=7 style=""| Regular season

|-
!colspan=7 style=""| ACC Tournament

|-
!colspan=7 style=""| NCAA Tournament

Awards and honors

2020 MLS Super Draft

Source:

Rankings

See also 

 Virginia Tech Hokies men's soccer
 2019 Atlantic Coast Conference men's soccer season
 2019 NCAA Division I men's soccer season

References 

2019
Virginia Tech Hokies
Virginia Tech Hokies
Virginia Tech Hokies men's soccer
Virginia Tech Hokies